Pikus  is a village in the administrative district of Gmina Iława, within Iława County, Warmian-Masurian Voivodeship, in northern Poland.

The village has a population of 100.

References

Pikus